The Observatoire Oceanologique de Villefranche (Villefranche-sur-Mer Marine Station) is a field campus of Sorbonne University (Faculty of Sciences and Engineering - FSI) in Villefranche-sur-Mer on the Côte d'Azur, France. It houses two research/teaching laboratories co-administered by Sorbonne University (SU) (Université Pierre et Marie Curie) and the Centre National de la Recherche Scientifique. The two laboratories are focused on Developmental Biology, and Oceanography.

The facility traces it roots back a laboratory established in 1882 by Hermann Fol with the encouragement of Charles Darwin and continues to work to this day with organisms from the Bay  of Villefranche Bay, including protists, ascidians, sea urchins and jellyfish.

History

In 1809 Charles Alexandre Lesueur and François Péron are credited with discovering the exceptional diversity of zooplankton in the bays of Villefranche and Cap de Nice and they were the first to describe new species from the bay (Péron & Lesueur 1809).

In the 1850s, the zoologist Carl Vogt visited Villefranche and studied the planktonic fauna found in the bay, notably the gelatinous zooplankton (Vogt 1852). He was followed by Johannes Peter Müller and Ernst Haeckel who both described planktonic protists, radiolaria, from the Bay of Villefranche (Müller 1858; Haeckel 1860).

In 1882, encouraged by Darwin, the zoologist and discoverer of fertilization Hermann Fol along with Jule Barrois of the Université de Lille, established a laboratory in Villefranche in a former Lazert building. They acquired use of buildings previously leased to the Russian Navy as a coal depot in 1884, the Galériens and the Vielle Forge. Barrois and Fol were forced to give up the facility in 1888 at the demand of Alexis Korotneff of the University of Kiev who had frequented the laboratory in previous years and now wanted to establish a Russian research facility: The "Russian Zoological Station" (Mosse 1952) . Russian, French, and American biologists including Hipployte Pergallo, Aleksei Alekseevich Korotnev, Carl Vogt, Hermann Fol, Jules Henri Barrois, Élie Metchnikoff and Louis Agassiz among others worked on the planktonic fauna and  embryos collected in the bay. To this day the Bay of Villefranche remains an exceptional natural resource for the study of plankton. Since the 1930s the facility has been administered by the University of Paris.

Building

The marine station is situated in historical buildings constructed in 1769 as part of the military harbour of the Kingdom of Sardinia which had Turin as its capital. The main building (bâtiment des galeriens) where the laboratories are now located was first used as a hospital and prison for galley slaves (mainly Turkish prisoners) who manned the war boats built in the adjacent drydock. In 1858 it was leased to the Russian Navy by the then governing authority of the Kingdom of Sardina for use as coal depot.

Mission
 Education: a teaching team composed of faculty members of Université Pierre et Marie Curie oversees many courses in oceanography for French and foreign students enrolled primarily at master's degree level.
 Research: the two laboratories are focused on developmental biology and cell biology and the other on oceanography  (biological, biochemical, physical and chemical oceanography).
 Observation: Comprehensive monitoring programs sample both the coastal environment of the Bay of Villefranche and an offshore site, 28 miles from Cap Ferrat. Activities in the Observatory include also research and development of new observation techniques such optical devices, gliders and floats.

References

Haeckel E. 1860. Abbildungen und Diagnosen neuer Gattungen und Arten von lebenden Radiolarien des Mittelmeeres. Monatsberichte der königliche Akademie der Wissenschaften zu Berlin, pp 835–845
Mosse W.E. 1952. The Russians at Villafrance. Slavonic & East European Review. 30:425-443
Müller J. 1858. Las über die Thalassicollen, Polycystinen und Acanthometren des Mittelmeeres. Abh Königl Akad Wiss Berlin, 1858:1-63
Péron F., Lesueur C.A. 1809 Tableau des caractères génériques et spécifiques de toutes les espèces de méduses connues jusqu'à ce jour. Ann Mus Nat Hist Natur (Paris) 14:325-366.
Vogt C. 1852. Ueber die Siphonophoren. Zeit Wissensch Zool 3:522-525

References

Laboratories in France
Oceanography
French Riviera
Education in Villefranche-sur-Mer
Buildings and structures in Villefranche-sur-Mer